Crites Hall, at 10th and Main Sts. in Chadron, Nebraska, is the student services building of Chadron State College.  The building is historic, dating from  1938, and is listed on the National Register of Historic Places.  It is in Art Deco style, designed by architect Gordon Shattuck, and was the first men's dormitory at the college.  It was listed on the National Register of Historic Places in 1983.

It is named for Edwin D. Crites (1884-1953), a first generation northwestern-Nebraskan who spent his career as an attorney in Chadron and was a State Normal Board member from 1931 to 1953.

Gordon Shattuck also designed the H. J. Bartenbach House, in Grand Island, Nebraska, which is also NRHP-listed.

References

External links 
More photos of the Crites Hall at Wikimedia Commons

University and college buildings on the National Register of Historic Places in Nebraska
Art Deco architecture in Nebraska
Buildings and structures completed in 1938
Buildings and structures in Dawes County, Nebraska
National Register of Historic Places in Dawes County, Nebraska